Santa Isabel Ishuatán is a municipality in the Sonsonate department of El Salvador.

Municipalities of the Sonsonate Department